Lee Tae-min (born 9 May 2003) is a Korean footballer currently playing as a forward for Busan IPark.

Career statistics

Club

Notes

References

2003 births
Living people
South Korean footballers
South Korea youth international footballers
Association football forwards
K League 2 players
Pohang Steelers players
Busan IPark players